The Staropromyslovsky massacre occurred between December 1999 and January 2000 when at least 38 confirmed civilians were summarily executed by Russian federal soldiers during an apparent spree in Staropromyslovsky City District of Grozny, the capital of the Chechen Republic, according to survivors and eyewitnesses. The killings went unpunished and publicly unacknowledged by the Russian authorities. In 2007, one case of a triple murder was ruled against Russia in the European Court of Human Rights (ECHR).

The murders
The killings occurred between late December 1999 and mid-January 2000, during the heavy fighting for the city. Most of the 38 victims were women and elderly men, and all appear to have been deliberately shot by Russian soldiers at close range. More than a dozen additional civilians may also have been murdered in the district; in addition, six men from Staropromyslovsky City District who were last seen in Russian custody "disappeared" during this same period and remain unaccounted for.

Aftermath
Russian military and civilian authorities are not known to have seriously investigated the Staropromyslovsky killings, as well as other similar incidents in Chechnya.

On November 29, 2007 the ECHR has made a decision on the case of Tangieva v. Russia in favor of a relative of victims of one of the summary executions in the district that took place in the early hours of January 11, 2000. The victims, parents of the applicant, were both shot dead alongside another woman in their home, which was then set alight. Their deaths were attributed to the Russian Federation; the Court also blamed Russia for the failure to provide an effective investigation.

See also
Alkhan-Yurt massacre
Novye Aldi massacre
Samashki massacre
List of massacres in Russia

References

External links
CASE OF TANGIYEVA v. RUSSIA (Application no. 57935/00) JUDGMENT

History of Chechnya
Massacres in 1999
Massacres in 2000
1999 in Russia
2000 in Russia
Massacres in Russia
War crimes of the Second Chechen War
December 1999 events in Russia
January 2000 events in Russia
December 1999 crimes
January 2000 crimes